Carlton Neron Thomas (born June 15, 1972) is an American R&B singer.

Biography
Thomas was born in Aurora, Illinois and attended East Aurora High School. He sang around Chicago and became a member of The Fourmula. He branched out, however, and traveled to New York City, where he sang at clubs during open-mic nights. One such performance caught the eye of Sean "Puffy" Combs, who signed Thomas to Bad Boy Entertainment in 1997.

Career
With the single "I Wish" released in late 1999, topping the R&B charts for six consecutive weeks, creating strong interest. Emotional, his debut album was released on April 18, 2000. On the strength of this single, and the album's other singles, "Summer Rain" at No. 18, which also appeared on the soundtrack to the 2000 film version of Shaft, and the title track "Emotional" at No. 8 on the R&B charts, the album was certified platinum with over 1 million in sales. Later rapper Jay-Z's "I Just Wanna Love U (Give It 2 Me)" interpolated Thomas' "I Wish" on his 2000 album The Dynasty: Roc La Familia. He sung in the track "Everyday" on The Understanding.

His second album, Let's Talk About It, was released on March 23, 2004. Although two singles – "She Is" and "Let's Talk About It" – were released, they charted poorly. Lack of promotion caused by the death of Thomas's brother Duranthony Evans, who was killed in a drive-by on Halloween night on Aurora's east side was a contributing factor. This devastated Thomas, causing him to take a sabbatical from his music and the promotion of the album.
The album was highly anticipated due to the length of time that had passed since Emotional but was not well received by fans. In 2005, Thomas was featured on R&B singer Amerie's second album Touch, on the ninth track, entitled "Can We Go".

On the 2006 2Pac album Pac's Life, he was featured beside Hussein Fatal and Papoose on the track "Dumpin'".

On December 7, 2006, Thomas earned a Grammy Award nomination, along with Chaka Khan, Yolanda Adams, and the late Gerald Levert, for "Everyday (Family Reunion)", a song from the soundtrack of Tyler Perry's Madea's Family Reunion. The song received a nomination for Best R&B Performance by a Duo Or Group With Vocals.

His third album, So Much Better, was released May 30, 2007, and reached number 25 on the US Billboard 200.

His last contract was with Verve Music Group. Thomas' last album entitled Conquer was released on December 6, 2011. The first single was "Don't Kiss Me", which featured Snoop Dogg and was written and produced by Rico Love.

Personal life 
In 2004, Thomas' brother was killed in a drive-by shooting shortly before Let's Talk About It came out. His brother was a corrections officer at the Illinois Youth Center in St. Charles before his death. The singer cancelled his tour to deal with his brother's death and his record label established the Duranthony Evans Foundation in his memory. In 2019, Thomas underwent a surgical procedure to remove a noncancerous tumor in his salivary glands.

Discography

Studio albums

Singles

References

External links
 carlthomaslive.com
 Facebook
 Carl Thomas bio
 Carl Thomas profile VIBE

1972 births
Living people
American contemporary R&B singers
Bad Boy Records artists
21st-century African-American male singers